Nordby Station is a railway station located two kilometers north of Jessheim in Ullensaker, Norway on the Trunk Line. The station was built in 1932 and is served by the Oslo Commuter Rail R13 from Drammen via Oslo S to Dal.

External links
 Jernbaneverket's entry on Nordby Station in English  

Railway stations on the Trunk Line
Railway stations in Ullensaker
Railway stations opened in 1932
1932 establishments in Norway